Crooked Straight is a 1919 American silent drama film directed by Jerome Storm and written by Julien Josephson. The film stars Charles Ray, Wade Boteler, Margery Wilson, Gordon Mullen, and Otto Hoffman. The film was released on November 9, 1919, by Paramount Pictures. It is not known whether the film currently survives.

Plot
“A youth comes to the city and is the victim of crooks. He is left by them penniless and discouraged. Driven to desperation, he becomes a safe-cracker himself, but in the end, of course, returns to honest living and marries the heroine.”

Cast
Charles Ray as Ben Trimble
Wade Boteler as Spark Nelson
Margery Wilson as Vera Owen
Gordon Mullen as Chick Larrabee
Otto Hoffman as Lucius Owen

References

External links 

 

1919 films
1910s English-language films
Silent American drama films
1919 drama films
Paramount Pictures films
Films directed by Jerome Storm
American black-and-white films
American silent feature films
1910s American films